Retrospect Spur is a spur, 7 nautical miles (13 km) long, descending north-northwest from the base of Separation Range into the east side of Hood Glacier. So named by the New Zealand Alpine Club Antarctic Expedition (1959–60) because they climbed the spur to obtain a panorama of Hood Glacier, which they had just traversed.    The outcropping Chevron Rocks are located at the north end of Retrospective Spur.
 

Ridges of the Ross Dependency
Dufek Coast